Phaleria disperma is an ornamental flowering evergreen plant native to the southwestern Pacific, where it is found in Fiji, Niue, Samoa, Tonga, and Wallis and Futuna.

References

disperma
Flora of Tonga
Flora of Fiji